The Wangenitzsee is an alpine lake in Carinthia, Austria.

In the southwestern part of the lake lie three small islands. The main inflow of the lake is the Kreuzsee, which is drained via the  into the Möll.

The flora in the area around the lake consists primarily of Carex curvula and Scheuchzer's cottongrass.
Lakes of Carinthia (state)
Schober Group